Jimmy Mulisa (born 24 April 1984) is a former footballer from Rwanda who played as a striker. He was also head coach at FC Sunrise, APR FC and Rwanda's national team.

Playing career
He played the 2008–2009 season for K.F.C. V.W. Hamme in Belgium.

In April 2014, Mulisa was signed by T-Team F.C. of Malaysia after trialling with the team.

International career
Mulisa has made several appearances for the Rwanda national football team, including 11 qualifying matches for the 2006 and 2010 FIFA World Cups.

References

External links
 
 
 
 

1984 births
Living people
People from Kigali
Rwandan footballers
Rwandan expatriate footballers
Rwanda international footballers
2004 African Cup of Nations players
Association football forwards
R.A.E.C. Mons players
K.V. Mechelen players
K.S.K. Beveren players
K.S.V. Roeselare players
APR F.C. players
Belgian Pro League players
Challenger Pro League players
Liga I players
CSM Ceahlăul Piatra Neamț players
Expatriate footballers in Belgium
Expatriate footballers in Romania
Expatriate footballers in Kazakhstan
Rwandan expatriate sportspeople in Romania
Rwandan expatriate sportspeople in Belgium
Rwandan expatriate sportspeople in Malaysia
Expatriate footballers in Malaysia
Rwandan football managers
Rwanda national football team managers